John H. Hamilton was a Negro league infielder in the 1920s.

Hamilton made his Negro leagues debut in 1924 with the Washington Potomacs. He went on to play for the Indianapolis ABCs and Cleveland Elites, and finished his career in 1929 with the Birmingham Black Barons.

References

External links
 and Seamheads

Place of birth missing
Place of death missing
Year of birth missing
Year of death missing
Birmingham Black Barons players
Cleveland Elites players
Indianapolis ABCs players
Washington Potomacs players
Baseball infielders